Royer is an unincorporated community and census-designated place (CDP) in Blair County, Pennsylvania, United States. It was first listed as a CDP prior to the 2020 census.

The CDP is in eastern Blair County, in the southwestern corner of Woodbury Township. It sits in the valley of Piney Creek, a northward-flowing tributary of the Frankstown Branch Juniata River. Pennsylvania Route 866 runs along the eastern edge of the community, leading northeast  to Williamsburg and south-southwest  to Martinsburg.

The Daniel Royer House, listed on the National Register of Historic Places, is in the eastern part of the community.

References 

Census-designated places in Blair County, Pennsylvania
Census-designated places in Pennsylvania